John Mahlon Marlin (May 6, 1836 – July 1, 1901) was an American firearms manufacturer and inventor.

Marlin was born in Boston Neck, near Windsor Locks, Hartford County, Connecticut as the son of Mahlon Marlin and Jennette Bradford.

He worked at the Colt plant in Hartford during the American Civil War. Starting in 1863, he made pistols in New Haven, Connecticut, expanding into manufacturing pistols and then different types of firearms by 1872, then called Marlin Fire Arms Company, today Marlin Firearms.

Initially producing single-shot weapons only, his company started manufacturing lever-action repeating rifles in 1881.

Marlin married Martha Susan nee Moore on May 27, 1862 in Windsor Locks. They had four children, two of which died young. Their sons Mahlon Henry and John Howard took over the company after their father's death in 1901.

Further reading 
 William S. Brophy: Marlin Firearms: A History Of The Guns & The Company That Made Them

External links 
 Short biography and picture
 Genealogy of his wife and children

1836 births
1901 deaths
Gunsmiths
People from Windsor Locks, Connecticut